News.am is an Armenian news agency based in Yerevan. The main topics of the agency are the social, political and economic developments in Armenia and Nagorno-Karabakh, as well as Diaspora communities around the world. It also focuses on the topical events, problems, and trends in the South Caucasus region. It is published in four languages; Armenian, English, Russian and Turkish.

See also 
 Media of Armenia

References

External links
Official website

2009 establishments in Armenia
News agencies based in Armenia
Armenian news websites